The Men's 60 kg judo competitions at the 2022 Commonwealth Games in Birmingham, England took place on August 1st at the Coventry Arena. A total of 20 competitors from 15 nations took part.

Results 
The draw is as follows:

Top half

Bottom half

Final

Repechages

References

External links
 
 Results
 

M60
2022